The East Cork Junior A Hurling Championship (known for sponsorship reasons as the Michael O'Connor Motor Factors East Cork Junior Hurling Championship) is an annual hurling competition organised by the Imokilly Board of the Gaelic Athletic Association since 1926 for junior hurling teams in East Cork.

The series of games begin in June, with the championship culminating with the final in September. The championship includes a knock-out stage and a "back door" for teams defeated in the first round.

The East Cork Junior Championship is an integral part of the wider Cork Junior A Hurling Championship. The winners and runners-up of the East Cork championship join their counterparts from the other six divisions to contest the county championship.

11 clubs currently participate in the East Cork Championship. The title has been won at least once by 20 different teams. The all-time record-holders are Castlemartyr who have won 11 titles.

Erin's Own are the title-holders after defeating Cobh by 4-12 to 2-09 in the 2022 final.

Format

Overview

The East Cork Junior Championship is a double elimination tournament. Each team is allowed two defeats before being eliminated from the championship.

Each match is played as a single leg. If a match ends as a draw there is a period of extra time, however, if both sides are still level at the end of extra time a replay takes place and so on until a winner is found.

Teams

2023 Teams

Roll of Honour

List of finals

Records

Gaps

Top five longest gaps between successive championship titles:
 51 years: Sarsfields (1953-2004)
 45 years: Castlemartyr (1964-2009)
 40 years: Aghada (1940-1980)
 38 years: Castlelyons (1955-1993)
 37 years: Midleton (1945-1982)
 36 years: Bride Rovers (1932-1968)
 34 years: St. Catherine's (1983-2017)
 34 years: Dungourney (1972-2006)
 33 years: Cobh (1926-1959)
 29 years: Bride Rovers (1969-1998)

2022 Championship

Group stage 
Group A

Group B

Knockout stage 
Relegation Playoff 

 Watergrasshill 2-22 - 3-11  Carrigtwohill

See also
 East Cork Junior A Football Championship

References

External link
 East Cork GAA website

East Cork Junior A Hurling Championship